The Lionel Tertis International Viola Competition is an international music competition for viola players established in 1980 to honor the memory of the English viola virtuoso Lionel Tertis. This triennial event is held at the Erin Arts Centre, Port Erin, Isle of Man. Participants are of any nationality and are under 30 years of age.

The 13th Lionel Tertis International Festival was held from 6 to 13 April 2019, and attracted 107 entries from around the world.

Lionel Tertis International Viola Competition

Required composition 
A compulsory work to be performed by all competitors is commissioned (or selected) for each competition.

 2019 – Canto for viola solo (2018) by Roxanna Panufnik 
 2016 – fenodyree for viola solo (2015) by Stuart MacRae
 2013 – 6 Sorano Variants for viola solo (2012) by Peter Maxwell Davies; published by Boosey & Hawkes 
 2010 – Petite Sonatine 1 for viola solo (2009) by Roger Steptoe; published by Editions BIM 
 2006 – Darkness Draws In for viola solo, Op. 102 (2005) by David Matthews; published by Faber Music Ltd.
 2003 – Through a Limbeck for viola solo (2002) by John Woolrich; published by Faber Music Ltd.
 2000 – Pennillion for viola solo (1998) by Sally Beamish; available through the Scottish Music Centre; This work was selected, not commissioned.
 1997 – Rondel for viola solo (1996) by Richard Rodney Bennett; published by Novello & Co.
 1994 – Odd Man Out for viola solo (1994) by Michael Berkeley; published by Oxford University Press
 1991 – February Sonatina for viola solo (1990) by John McCabe; published by Novello & Co.
 1988 – Tides of Mananan for viola solo, Op. 64 (1988) by Paul Patterson; published by Josef Weinberger
 1984 – Concerto for viola and orchestra, Op. 131 (1983) by Wilfred Josephs; published by Mornington Music Ltd. / Novello & Co.
 1980 – Concerto No. 2 in G major for viola and orchestra (1979) by Gordon Jacob; published by Boosey & Hawkes

See also
 List of classical music competitions
 Maurice Vieux International Viola Competition
 Primrose International Viola Competition

References 
 Lionel Tertis International Viola Competition
 White, John (2006).  Lionel Tertis The First Great Virtuoso of the Viola, 362–365.

External links 
 Lionel Tertis International Viola Competition
 Erin Arts Centre photo gallery

Manx music
Music competitions in the United Kingdom